Garden State is the soundtrack album to the film Garden State. Compilation producer Zach Braff was awarded a Grammy Award for Best Compilation Soundtrack Album for Motion Pictures, Television or Other Visual Media for his work on the album.

Album information 
The music that accompanied the film was hand-picked by Zach Braff. Commenting on the selections, Braff said, "Essentially, I made a mix CD with all of the music that I felt was scoring my life at the time I was writing the screenplay."

The film’s budget limitations meant that obtaining all the songs Braff wanted for the film proved difficult, but Braff felt that the soundtrack was so integral to the script, he sent a copy of it with every request he sent out.

The music in the film features a number of indie-rock artists, notably the Shins. In an early scene, Sam passes Andrew a headset which is playing the song "New Slang" by the Shins as she says "You gotta hear this one song — it’ll change your life; I swear." A second Shins song, "Caring Is Creepy", is also featured on the soundtrack.

Songs that did not appear on the album 
The song "Orange Sky" by Alexi Murdoch was also featured in the movie, but did not appear on the soundtrack, as the rights to the song were owned by Fox's The O.C. It was played between "New Slang" and "I Just Don't Think I'll Ever Get Over You" in the film. The song "Hey Lil' Momma" by the Sho-Shot AllStars is playing in the background of the party scene where Jesse reveals selling his silent Velcro patent. Later during the party the song "Whitey" by Everlast is playing in the background during a game of Spin the bottle in the interlude between portions of the song "In the Waiting Line".

Additionally, "Love Will Come Through" by Travis was used in the film’s trailer, but never made it into the film or onto its soundtrack. The trailer also featured "Such Great Heights" in the original version by the Postal Service rather than the Iron & Wine cover used in the film. The song "Chocolate" by Snow Patrol appeared in the commercials but didn't appear on the soundtrack. The song "Adelita" by Francisco Tárrega was played on guitar by Peter Sarsgaard when he was talking to Zach Braff in his room, and played on the video of Sam ice skating in the alligator costume. Also, "Three Times A Lady" by Lionel Richie is sung during the funeral scene. Neither song appears on the soundtrack. Additional instrumental composition by Chad Fischer "Motorcycle Ride with Sam" was featured in the DVD menu.

Reception 
Zach Braff received a Grammy Award in 2005 for Best Compilation Soundtrack Album for a Motion Picture, Television or Other Visual Media. The Broadcast Film Critics Association nominated it for Best Soundtrack.

Commenting on the soundtrack’s importance to the film, Sponic Zine wrote 

The album has sold over 1.3 million copies and has been certified as platinum by the Recording Industry Association of America.

In popular culture 
In an episode of Saturday Night Live hosted by Braff, Braff plays a high school student in a skit where various high school interest groups are attempting to select a theme for the upcoming senior prom. Braff’s character suggests a Garden State theme because the soundtrack "changed [his] life", but the prom committee describes it as a "Pitchfork mix CD". Braff's character replies that he happens to know "...those songs were very carefully chosen"; nevertheless, the idea is quickly dismissed. He then puts on headphones with the sound of "New Slang" by the Shins playing in the background.

Track listing

See also 
 The Last Kiss soundtrack
 Wish I Was Here soundtrack

External links 
 Garden State Soundtrack Official Site
 Garden State Film Official Site

Certifications

References 

2004 soundtrack albums
Grammy Award for Best Compilation Soundtrack for Visual Media
Various artists albums
Romance film soundtracks
Comedy film soundtracks
Drama film soundtracks